Svätá Zvrhlosť ("Depravity of The Pious") is the first official album of Slovak thrash metal band Majster Kat, released on October 24, 2007 on the Panda Music label.

Review

Musical description
The album contains 12 tracks.  The CD attracts by frequent changing of moods. It contains fast thrash metal songs with melodic lines as well as atmospheric instrumental songs with acoustic guitar passages.

Lyrical themes
All lyrics are in Slovak and concern the absurdity of the inquisition era and inhumanity of armed conflicts.

Track listing
 "Zapáľte ohne" (Music: Los, Lukáš/Lyrics: Slymák)
 "Pod gilotínou" (Music: Los, Tapyr/Lyrics: Slymák)
 "Kat" (Music: Los, Gabo /Lyrics: Slymák)
 "Tieň minulosti" (Music: Los /Lyrics: Slymák)
 "Pád" (Music: Gabo, Los /Lyrics: Slymák)
 "Večný odpočinok" (Music: Los)
 "Smutný odkaz" (Music: Los, Lukáš /Lyrics: Slymák)
 "V údolí včiel" (Music: Gabo, Los /Lyrics: Slymák)
 "Vláda šakalov" (Music: Los, Gabo /Lyrics: Slymák)
 "Začiatok konca" (Music: Gabo, Los)
 "Posledný deň" (Music: Los, Gabo /Lyrics: Slymák)
 "Toľko nevinných..." (Music: Los)

Personnel
 Slymák - vocals
 Los - lead guitar, backing vocals
 Lukáš - guitar
 Tapyr - bass, backing vocals
 Bubonix - drums

External links
 www.majsterkat.sk - The official site of Majster Kat.
 Review of the Svätá Zvrhlosť album on METAL REVIEWS

2007 debut albums
Majster Kat albums